William Rawlings may refer to:

Bill Rawlings (1896–1972), English footballer
William Henley Rawlings (1848–1906), English-born Australian politician
William Reginald Rawlings (1892–1918), Australian army officer
William V. Rawlings (1913–1975), American politician from Virginia